Lichtenwörth (Central Bavarian: Lichtnwiad) is a market town in Austria. It is situated by the rivers Leitha and Warme Fischa. The market town has a kindergarten school, an elementary school and a high school.  It also has a music school.

History 
The place was first mentioned in 1174. Also in the 12th century, a water castle was built, which was destroyed at the end of the 15th century.

In 1747, under the regency of Maria Theresa, the needle factory Nadelburg was established. The factory was expanded with a cotton mill in the early 19th century. A workers' settlement grew around the factories. The Nadelburg was closed in 1930. It is now a museum.

Lichtenwörth became a market town in 1992.

Lichtenworth is also remembered for its concentration slave labor camp during the Third Reich. It was a sub-camp of Mauthausen. Mainly Jewish women were force marched from Budapest. The conditions were brutal, and many died there.

Notable People from Lichtenwörth 
 Dominic Thiem: Professional tennis player who won the 2020 US Open title, and reached three other Grand Slam finals. He holds a career-high ranking of No. 3 in March 2020.

Politics 
The council of Lichtenwörth consists of 21 members, grouped in 4 parties (2010 elections).

 SPÖ: 11 members
 ÖVP: 5 members
 LPL: 4 members
 UFO (Unabhängiges Forum): 1 member

References

Gallery

Cities and towns in Wiener Neustadt-Land District
Populated places on the Leitha
Holocaust locations in Austria